Ovenstone is a surname. Notable people with the surname include:

 Davie Ovenstone (1913–1983), Scottish footballer
 Douglas Ovenstone (1921–2011), South African cricketer